Eastern Youth is a Japanese punk rock trio formed in 1989 in Hokkaidō. Their sound blends many different styles, and is especially complex for a three-piece band. Their lyrics express the helplessness of Japanese youths. Their influences include Fugazi, Jawbreaker, Jets to Brazil, Stiff Little Fingers and Discharge.

Career
Eastern Youth was formed as Scanners in 1989 by childhood friends Hisashi Yoshino and Atsuya Tamori in Sapporo, Hokkaidō. From 1989 to 1993 they were the top oi!/skinhead act in Japan. The released 3 albums, 1 single and were on several compilation albums. The band changed the name from EASTERN YOUTH to eastern youth, and shed the skinhead image of their past. The band moved to Tokyo in 1990. In 1995, they put out their first release on their own record label, 坂本商店: (Sakamoto-Shoten) 口笛、夜更けに響 Kuchibue Yofuke-ni-Hibiku ("A Whistle Rings Late At Night"). Within the next 5 years, Eastern Youth became legendary to the Japanese indie rock scene and in 2000 they played in the United States for the first time, with At The Drive-In, largely broadening their popularity. They continued to tour America with Jimmy Eat World in 2001, and Saddle Creek band Cursive in 2006, with whom Eastern Youth split sides on 2003's 8 Teeth to Eat You EP.
During the "Bottom of the world"-Tour 2015 Tomokazu Ninomiya announces that he will be leaving the band. He was replaced by Muraoka Yuka.

Members
Hisashi Yoshino – vocals, guitar
Atsuya Tamori – drums
Yuka Muraoka – bass

Discography

Singles
 For Skins and Punks EP (1991)
 Noboru Asahi Abite (1991)
 Hadashi de Ikazaru wo Enai (1996)
 Aosugiru Sora (1997)
 Kaze no Naka (1999)
 Amazarashi nara Nureru ga Ii sa (1999)
 Seijaku ga Moeru (2000)
 Kakatonaru (2001)
 Sekai ha Warehibiku Miminari no you da (2002)
 Kyousei Shiryoku 0.6 (Corrected Eyesight 0.6) (2004)
 Boiling Point 36 °C (October 24, 2007)
 Akai-Inoatama Blues (February 6, 2008)
 Tokeidai no Kane (November 14, 2018)

Albums
 East End Land (1989)
 Time Is Running (1990)
 Eastern Youth (1993)
 口笛、夜更けに響く (1995)
 孤立無援の花 (1997)
 旅路ニ季節ガ燃エ落チル (1998)
 雲射抜ケ声 (1999)
 感受性応答セヨ (2001)
 其処カラ何ガ見エルカ (2003) "What Can You See From Your Place"
 DON QUIJOTE (2004)
 365步のブルース (2006) "365-Step Blues"
 地球の裏から風が吹く (2007) "Blowing from the Other Side of the Earth"
 歩幅と太陽 (2009) "The Pace With the Sun"
 心ノ底ニ灯火トモセ (2011) "Kokoro No Soko Ni Tomoshibi Tomose"
 叙景ゼロ番地 (2012) "Jokei Zero Banchi"
 ボトムオブザワールド (2015) "Bottom Of The World"
 SONGentoJIYU (2017)
 2020 (2020)

DVDs
 Sono Zanzou to Zankyouon (2001)
 Archives 1997–2001 (2004)
日比谷野外大音楽堂公演 DVD 2019.9.28 (2020)

Notes

External links
 Official Eastern Youth website
 Eastern Youth Myspace Page

Japanese indie rock groups
Japanese punk rock groups
Musical groups from Hokkaido
Musical groups established in 1989